The VL8is an electric two-unit mainline DC freight locomotive used in the Soviet Union, still operated today by the state owned Russian rail company RZhD and Ukrainian Railways. The initials VL are those of Vladimir Lenin, after whom the class is named.

History
The VL8 series was built as a replacement for the ageing VL22м which, by 1953, no longer met Soviet rail requirements. The VL8s were manufactured at the Tbilisi Electric Locomotive Works (ТЭВЗ) between 1957–1967, as well as the Novocherkassk Electric Locomotive Plant.

Gallery

See also
 Novocherkassk Electric Locomotive Plant
 Russian Railway Museum
 Museum of the Moscow Railway (Moscow Rizhsky station)
 History of rail transport in Russia

References 

Electric locomotives of Russia
Electric locomotives of Ukraine
Electric locomotives of the Soviet Union
3000 V DC locomotives
Bo′Bo′+Bo′Bo′ locomotives
Railway locomotives introduced in 1953
5 ft gauge locomotives